Soghoian is a surname. Notable people with the surname include:

Christopher Soghoian (born 1981), American privacy researcher and activist
Sal Soghoian, American user automation expert, software developer, author, and musician

Armenian-language surnames